The 1928 Cork Senior Football Championship was the 40th staging of the Cork Senior Football Championship since its establishment by the Cork County Board in 1887. 

University College Cork entered the championship as the defending champions.

On 14 October 1928, University College Cork won the championship following a 1-06 to 0-02 defeat of Duhallow United in the final at The Mardyke. This was their third championship title overall and their second title in succession.

Results

Final

References

Cork Senior Football Championship